Jorge Iván Estrada Manjarrez (born 16 October 1983) is a Mexican former professional footballer.

A full-back, his key attributes are his speed and dribbling skills, which makes up for his short height.

Club career
Estrada made his debut on 20 October 2004 against Pachuca, a game which resulted in a 1–0 loss for, his then-team, Dorados de Sinaloa.

International career
He received his first cap in a friendly match against Venezuela on 12 October 2010. His first call to the Mexico national team came in the midst of a conflict between players and now former National Team Director, Nestor de la Torre, and on top of that Estrada suffered an injury that allowed him to play only the first 24 minutes, he was injured by Venezuelan defender Gabriel Cichero.

International appearances

As of 12 October 2010

Honours
Santos Laguna
 Primera División de México: Clausura 2008, Clausura 2012Tigres UANL Liga MX: Apertura 2015, Apertura 2016, Apertura 2017
 Copa MX: Clausura 2014
 Campeón de Campeones: 2016, 2017Individual'''
 Best full back of the tournament: Apertura 2007, Bicentenario 2010, Apertura 2010, Clausura 2012

References

External links
 
 Profile 
 Jorge Iván Estrada's Statistics 
 

1983 births
Living people
Footballers from Sinaloa
Sportspeople from Culiacán
Association football fullbacks
Mexico international footballers
Dorados de Sinaloa footballers
C.D. Veracruz footballers
Santos Laguna footballers
C.F. Pachuca players
Tigres UANL footballers
Liga MX players
Mexican footballers